Container Corporation of America (CCA) was founded in 1926 and manufactured corrugated boxes. In 1968 CCA merged with Montgomery Ward & Company, Inc., becoming MARCOR. MARCOR maintained separate management for the operations of each company, but had a joint board of directors. In 1986, Mobil Corporation, which had bought MARCOR in the early 1970s, sold the CCA company to the Jefferson Smurfit Corporation, which merged with the Stone Container Corporation in 1998 to become part of the Smurfit-Stone Container Corporation. 

Under the leadership of Walter Paepcke, CCA was a patron of graphic arts and design. The company amassed a collection of art works which eventually found their way to the National Museum of American Art.

In the late 1940s, CCA commissioned Herbert Bayer to create a World Geo-Graphic Atlas which was distributed free to more than 150 colleges and universities. A review described it as the "handsomest and best atlas ever published in America."

The Container Corporation of America headquarters were located in Chicago, Illinois, in the United States.

See also
 Descriptive Color Names Dictionary

References

External links
1995 Superfund penalty (U.S. Department of Justice)
"Changes of the Week". Time. May 5, 1961.

Manufacturing companies established in 1926
American companies established in 1926
Manufacturing companies based in St. Louis
Privately held companies based in Missouri
Packaging companies of the United States
1998 mergers and acquisitions